Mildef International Technologies or Mildef 
(former name: Kembara Suci Sdn. Bhd.) is a Malaysian private company established in 2005. Its main business is related to the defense sector especially in land vehicle. This involved the development, manufacture and distribution of military and law enforcement vehicles, as well as providing maintenance services.

History

Mildef was founded in 2005 under the name of Kembara Suci Sdn Bhd. It has long time been a company that involves in maintenance, repair and overhaul for the Malaysian Armed Forces vehicles. This company also provided upgrade service for the ageing military vehicle for the Malaysian Armed Forces as part of the low cost solution.

In 2016, the company introduces one upgraded prototype of the Scorpion light tank for the army.

In 2018, Mildef launched its first locally made Special Operation Vehicle (SOV) at Defense Services Asia (DSA) 2018.

In 2020, Mildef had signed the Memorandum of Understanding (MOU) with Science Technology Research Institute for Defence (STRIDE), which is defence technology research statutory board under the Ministry of Defence (Malaysia) to develop, integrate and manufacture of 6x6 armoured vehicle.

In 2021, the Mildef Tarantula HMAV was launched by the company. The vehicle is aimed to be promoted to the local and international market.

In DSA 2022, the company has unveiling their new two products, Mildef Rentaka 4×4 armoured vehicle and Mildef Tedung LSV which is a type of light strike vehicle. Mildef Rentaka 4×4 was launched by Yang Di-Pertuan Agong, Sultan Abdullah during the exhibition. The company also present their first armoured vehicle, Mildef Tarantula HMAV and the upgraded version prototype of the ACV-300 Adnan.

Products

Armoured vehicle
 Mildef Tarantula HMAV
 Mildef Rentaka 4x4

Special operation vehicle / Light strike vehicle
 Mildef SOV
 Mildef Tedung LSV

Recovery vehicle
 Mildef MRV 6x6
Medium recovery vehicle based on 6x6 Iveco Trakker 380 truck chassis. Powered by CURSOR 13-F3B 440 hp diesel engine. The lift tow system is developed locally by Mildef able to lift vehicle weighing up to 26 tons.

References

2005 establishments in Malaysia
Military vehicle manufacturers
Defense companies of Malaysia
Malaysian brands
Privately held companies of Malaysia